Adham Al-Akrad, also known by his kunya as Abu Qusay, (1974 – 14 October 2020), was a Syrian rebel leader in Daraa Governorate during the Syrian Civil War. He agreed to a settlement with the government after the entire governorate came under the Syrian army's control in 2018.

Al-Akrad was a strong critic of the regime and the Iranian presence in the south. He was killed on his way to a meeting in Damascus in October 2020.

Personal life 
He was living in the United Arab Emirates before the start of the Syrian civil uprising in March 2011. Where he was the manager of an energy engineering company there, as an energy engineer. Al-Akrad also resided in Russia for a while. He was married to his cousin and they had five sons.

References 

1974 births
2020 deaths
People from Daraa District
Military personnel killed in the Syrian civil war
Syrian engineers
Members of the Free Syrian Army